Palace Green is a grassed area in the centre of Durham, County Durham, England.

Palace Green may also refer to:

Palace Green, Kensington, a street in London
Palace Green, a grassed area in the centre of Ely, Cambridgshire, England
Palace Green, a grassed area in the centre of Colonial Williamsburg, Virginia, US